The GrooveBarbers are an American a cappella musical group formed in 1997 in New York City. The band consists of Sean Altman, Steve Keyes, Charlie Evett, Kevin Weist, and Johnny Ryan, the first three of whom are former members of Rockapella. Inna Dukach, Altman's wife, also appears as a regular opera singing diva.

Discography 

 2005: Glory
 2010: Guts
 2014: Warning: Barbershop!
 2016: Zombie Jamboree

Filmography 
 In 2006 and 2007, the GrooveBarbers appeared in two commercials for Astelin. They were dubbed "The Astelins".
 The GrooveBarbers were all contestants on the game show Eastern Expedition.
 The GrooveBarbers also made an appearance on Full Frontal with Samantha Bee in 2017.

References

External links 
 Official Website
 Official Facebook Page

A cappella musical groups
Musical groups established in 1997
Musical groups from New York City
1997 establishments in New York City
American vocal groups